Robert Cuccioli (born May 3, 1958) is an American actor and singer. He is best known for originating the lead dual title roles in the musical Jekyll and Hyde, for which he received a Tony Award nomination and won the Joseph Jefferson Award, the Outer Critics Circle Award, the Drama Desk Award, and the Fany Award for outstanding actor in a musical.

After beginning his career Off-Broadway at the Light Opera of Manhattan in the 1980s, Cuccioli starred as Lancelot du Lac in national tours of Camelot in 1987 and first appeared on Broadway in 1993 as Javert in Les Misérables. He has appeared in numerous New York and regional productions since then, including his long-running stints on Broadway in Jekyll and Hyde (1997–1999) and as the Green Goblin in Spider-Man: Turn Off the Dark (2012–2014). Cuccioli has also appeared in films and on television.

Life and career
Cuccioli was born in Hempstead, New York. He attended St. Mary's High School in Manhasset, New York, and college at St. John's University in Jamaica, New York, earning a degree in Finance.  Before moving into theatre as a career, he worked as a financial consultant at E. F. Hutton for three years.  

Cuccioli has been in a relationship with actress Laila Robins since 2000. 

He released his first solo album, The Look of Love, a collection of standards from the 1930s and 1940s, in 2012.

Broadway and national tours
Cuccioli starred as Lancelot de Lac in U.S. and Canadian national tours of Camelot in 1987, with Richard Harris. He first appeared on Broadway as Javert in Les Misérables in 1993 and continued to appear in the musical as a replacement until early January 1995, when he began rehearsals for the pre-Broadway national tour of Jekyll and Hyde. In 1997, Cuccioli received a Tony Award nomination for his performance in the dual title roles in the musical Jekyll and Hyde, also winning the Joseph Jefferson Award, the Outer Critics Circle Award, the Drama Desk Award and the Fany Award for that role. On September 26, 2005, he starred as Dr. Johnson in the special benefit performance of On the Twentieth Century at the New Amsterdam Theatre.

Cuccioli returned to Broadway beginning August 7, 2012, when he took over from Patrick Page in the dual role of Norman Osborn and his alter ego Green Goblin in the rock musical Spider-Man: Turn Off the Dark.

Off-Broadway and regional theatre
Early in his career, Cuccioli spent several years learning the ropes off-Broadway at the Light Opera of Manhattan, starting out in the chorus, quickly moving up to smaller featured roles and then playing leading roles, such as Count Danilo in The Merry Widow, the Pirate King in The Pirates of Penzance, and Captain Corcoran in H.M.S. Pinafore. His other notable off-Broadway appearances include Nathan in the long-running revival of The Rothschilds (1990); the highly successful 1991 Kander and Ebb revue, And The World Goes 'Round, which garnered him an Outer Critics Circle Award in 1991; and he played the title role of in the Maury Yeston and Arthur Kopit musical, Phantom, at the Westchester Broadway Theater in 1992–93, a role that he has repeated.  In 2000, he played Macheath in The Threepenny Opera. He was also seen as Karl Streber in Temporary Help in 2002 and in Mirette (a new musical by Harvey Schmidt) with York Theatre in 2005.

Cuccioli's U.S. regional theatre credits include Ankles Aweigh at the Goodspeed Opera House in 1988, Jud Fry  in Oklahoma! at the Paper Mill Playhouse in 1992, Archibald Craven in the Sacramento Music Circus production of The Secret Garden (1999), The Actor in Enter the Guardsman at the New Jersey Shakespeare Festival (1999 and again off-Broadway in 2000), King Marchan in Victor/Victoria at the Paper Mill in 2000, Nick Arnstein in Funny Girl at the Paper Mill in 2001, Antony in Antony and Cleopatra at the New Jersey Shakespeare Festival (2002), Captain von Trapp in The Sound of Music at the Paper Mill in 2003, and Sky Masterson in Guys and Dolls at the Paper Mill in 2004, with Karen Ziemba and Kate Baldwin.  His 2005 theatrical credits include Alexander di Medici in Lorenzaccio at The Shakespeare Theatre in Washington, DC, and Capt. von Trapp in The Sound of Music at the Bendedum Theatre in Pennsylvania. He has also starred in shows at The Shakespeare Theatre of New Jersey, where he has played the title role in Macbeth (2004), Brutus in Julius Caesar (2005) and Antonio Salieri in Amadeus (2008), among others; at the New York's Equity Library Theatre; and in regional theatres around the United States.

Cuccioli's later stage appearances include the off-Broadway revue, Jacques Brel is Alive and Well and Living in Paris in 2006. In June and July 2007, he played Claudius in Hamlet at The Lansburgh Theatre in Washington, D.C. with the Shakespeare Theatre Company.  In 2007, he appeared in pre-Broadway tryouts of Lone Star Love in Seattle, starring Randy Quaid, but the Broadway run was cancelled. Later that year he played the title character in Man of La Mancha at the White Plains, New York Performing Arts Center. Cuccioli reprised the title role of the Maury Yeston and Arthur Kopit musical, Phantom, at the Westchester Broadway Theater from December 2007 to February 2008. He also is heard on a concept album for a new musical, The New Picasso, which was released in 2008. In 2008, he returned to the White Plains Performing Arts Center to play King Arthur in Camelot and starred in Conor McPherson's The Seafarer at George Street Playhouse in New Jersey.  In 2009, he starred in Thom Thomas's A Moon to Dance By, at the Pittsburgh Playhouse and at the George Street Playhouse, with Jane Alexander, and played John Dickinson in 1776 at the Paper Mill Playhouse.

In 2015, with York Theatre, he starred as Mayer Rothschild in Rothschild & Sons, a reworking of The Rothschilds. Although the show was critically panned, Cuccioli's performance was praised. In 2019, he played the title role in Caesar and Cleopatra in off-Broadway's Theatre Row Building in a production by The Gingold Theatrical Group. For the same company in the same venue, he starred as Sir George Crofts in Mrs. Warren's Profession in 2021. He next starred as Cornelius "Con" Melody in A Touch of the Poet in Irish Repertory Theatre's 2022 off-Broadway production. David Finkle, writing for New York Stage Review, called Cuccioli's performance "grand ... another addition to a resumé attesting to Cuccioli’s place as a foremost tragedian".

Television and film
Cuccioili's television appearances include Sliders (1999) and Baywatch (1997). He played Chief Franklin on The Guiding Light. He also appeared on All My Children and One Life to Live. He has appeared in several films, including in Woody Allen's Celebrity (1998), Operation Delta Force 3: Clear Target (1999), Heroic Times and The Stranger.

Directing
Cuccioli directed The Glass Menagerie in 2003 at The Shakespeare Theater of New Jersey. He has also directed productions of Jekyll & Hyde at Houston's Theatre Under the Stars, Pittsburgh Civic Light Opera and The Westchester Broadway Theatre.

Notable theatre roles

Notes

References
 Biography of Cuccioli

External links
 
 
 
 Profile of and interview with Cuccioli, August 2006
 Information and listing of Cuccioli credits
 Extensive interview with Cuccioli during the run of Jacques Brel in 2006

1958 births
Living people
American male musical theatre actors
American male television actors
American male stage actors
People from Hempstead (village), New York
People from Manhasset, New York